Kodak Express is the world's largest branded photo processing network operating in 41 countries and with over 26,000 stores worldwide offering Kodak products and services including photo books, gifts, digital cameras, frames and traditional printing. Stores are locally owned and operated with the support of Kodak and their regions program manager for marketing, product purchasing and technical support.

References 

Kodak